Founded in 1910 for small farmers, allotment holders and gardeners, Smallholder magazine is published monthly by Packet Newspapers in Falmouth, Cornwall. It is a national UK magazine.

Current articles
 School farms
 Community supported agriculture
 Government policy towards smallholders
 Animal housing

External links
 Smallholder Website

Agricultural magazines
Business magazines published in the United Kingdom
Monthly magazines published in the United Kingdom
Land management
Magazines established in 1910
Mass media in Cornwall